Thomas L. Brunell (born 1968) is an American political scientist and professor at the University of Texas at Dallas.

Brunell studied political science and earned a Ph.D. in 1997 from the University of California, Irvine. His research and teaching mainly focus on American politics - elections, Congress, political parties, and redistricting.  In 2008, he published a book entitled Rethinking Redistricting: Why Competitive Elections are Bad for America.

In 2017, he was mentioned as a possible nominee to direct the U.S. Census Bureau but withdrew his nomination after controversy over government experience.

Selected books

References 

University of Texas at Dallas faculty
Living people
American political scientists
1968 births
University of California, Irvine alumni